The Jardin botanique de Lyon (English: Botanical Garden of Lyon), also known as the Jardin botanique du Parc de la Tête d'Or (Botanical Garden of the Golden Head), is an  municipal botanical garden located in the Parc de la Tête d'or in the 6th arrondissement of Lyon, France. It is open weekdays without charge.

History
The garden was established in 1857 as a successor to earlier botanical gardens dating to 1796; it is now described as France's largest municipal botanical garden. It contains about 15,000 plants, including 3,500 plants of temperate regions, 760 species of shrubs, a hundred species of wild roses, 750 varieties of historical roses, 200 varieties of peonies recognised by the Conservatoire Français des Collections Végétales Spécialisées (CCVS), 1,800 species of alpine plants, 50 varieties of water lilies, as well as 6,000 species in its greenhouses.

See also 
 List of botanical gardens in France

References 

 Jardin botanique de Lyon
 Jardin botanique de Lyon: History (English)
 Ville de Lyon: Le Jardin Botanique (French)
 Loisirs Parc de la Tête d'Or (French)

6th arrondissement of Lyon
Lyon, Jardin botanique de
Lyon, Jardin botanique de
Tourist attractions in Lyon
Greenhouses in France